Hope's Nose is a coastal headland, separating Tor Bay from Babbacombe Bay. It is visible from much of the town and harbour of Torquay, Devon. It has been a Site of Special Scientific Interest along with the nearby Wall's Hill since 1986.

History 
During the 19th century gold was found at the headland. Samples of this can be seen at the Natural History Museum in London.

References 

Headlands of Devon